The 2022 Tournoi de France was the second edition of the Tournoi de France, an invitational women's football tournament held annually in France. It took place from 16 to 22 February 2022.

Teams
Four teams participated.

Squads

Standings

Results
All times are local (UTC+1).

Goalscorers

References

2022
Tournoi de France
Tournoi de France
Tournoi de France